Brett Barry Clark (born December 23, 1976) is a Canadian-American former professional ice hockey defenceman. He previously played in the National Hockey League with the Montreal Canadiens, Atlanta Thrashers, Colorado Avalanche, Tampa Bay Lightning and the Minnesota Wild.

Playing career
Clark was drafted in the 6th round, 154th overall, by the Montreal Canadiens in the 1996 NHL Entry Draft. He was selected from the University of Maine of the Hockey East where he named to the All-Rookie Team in his freshman year. Under the preference of the Canadiens, Clark spent the following season developing with the Canadian National Team program, before he made his professional debut in the 1997–98 season.

After only 20 games with AHL affiliate, the Fredericton Canadiens, Clark made his debut with the Canadiens and remained with the team scoring a goal, on his 21st birthday, in 41 games for the season. Not used as a depth defenseman in the playoffs, he further established himself in the 1998–99 season, appearing in 61 contests for the Canadiens.

On June 25, 1999, Clark was claimed in the 1999 expansion draft by the Atlanta Thrashers. His NHL career stalled with the Thrashers, unable to find a role in his three seasons. He found success on the Thrashers' minor-league affiliate team, winning  the Turner Cup in 2001 with the Orlando Solar Bears.

During the 2001–02 season on January 24, 2002, Clark was traded by the Thrashers to the Colorado Avalanche for Frederic Cassivi. He spent the majority of the next three seasons with the Avalanche's affiliate, the Hershey Bears of the AHL. He was twice named the Bears' best defenseman of the year, and led the AHL in plus/minus (+28) in 2000–01.

After the 2004 NHL Lockout, and at age 28, Clark finally established a role as a two-way defenseman with the Avalanche in 2005–06. He appeared in 80 games and scored a respectable 36 points. In his playoff debut, he scored against the Dallas Stars in game one of the Western Conference Quarterfinals on April 22, and subsequently finished the playoffs tied with Rob Blake for the team scoring lead among defenseman with four points. On June 30, 2006, Clark re-signed on a two-year contract with Colorado.

In the 2006–07 season, Clark had a career-high year appearing in 82 games and scoring 10 goals for 39 points and leading the NHL in average shifts per game. On February 24, 2007, Clark played in his 300th career NHL game against the Los Angeles Kings.

On August 27, 2007, Clark signed a two-year contract extension with the Avalanche prior to the 2007–08 season. He again led the NHL in shifts per game before he was sidelined for the rest of the regular season and playoffs after suffering a dislocated shoulder on February 12, 2008. In 2008–09 Clark returned to set an Avalanche record of 238 hits, second in the NHL, but struggled offensively in recording 12 points in 76 games. In the 2009–10 season, on January 29, Clark appeared in his 500th career NHL game against the Dallas Stars.

After eight seasons within the Avalanche organization Clark left as a free agent to sign a two-year contract with the Tampa Bay Lightning on July 5, 2010. In the 2010–11 season, Clark was re-inserted on the powerplay with the Lightning and produced 9 goals for his highest total since 2007, helping the Lightning advance to the 2011 Eastern Conference finals.

A free agent upon the 2012 NHL lockout, Clark signed an AHL contract with the Oklahoma City Barons during the midpoint of the 2012–13 season on January 21, 2013. Clark immediately established himself within the Barons producing 17 points in just 18 games. On March 13, 2013, Clark signalled his return to the NHL after he was signed to add a veteran presence for the remainder of the season with the Minnesota Wild. Clark primarily was used as a reserve defensemen however played in 8 games with the Wild, compiling 1 assist.

A free agent again well into the 2013–14 season, Clark signed a professional try-out with the Lake Erie Monsters on December 6, 2013, marking a return of sorts to NHL affiliate, the Colorado Avalanche. Unable to help the Monsters qualify for the playoffs, Clark was still able to contribute from the blueline with 6 goals and 14 points in 53 games.

Prior to the 2014–15 season, Clark announced the end of his playing career but remained in the Avalanche organization by accepting a player development consultant position.

Personal life
Brett is married to Candace and has 2 kids; son Cail, born in 2003, and daughter Ava, who was born December 10, 2007. He is the nephew of NHL hockey player Dave Dunn.

On July 5, 2018, Clark was formally sworn in as a United States citizen, having resided in Denver, Colorado since his retirement.

Career statistics

Awards and honors

References

External links

1976 births
Atlanta Thrashers players
Canadian ice hockey defencemen
Chicago Wolves players
Colorado Avalanche players
Fredericton Canadiens players
Hershey Bears players
Ice hockey people from Saskatchewan
Lake Erie Monsters players
Living people
Maine Black Bears men's ice hockey players
Melville Millionaires players
Minnesota Wild players
Montreal Canadiens draft picks
Montreal Canadiens players
Oklahoma City Barons players
Orlando Solar Bears (IHL) players
Tampa Bay Lightning players